Mohamed Ajfan Rasheed (born 15 February 1990) is a Maldivian badminton player.

Career
Ajfan took part in the 2010 Asian Games and Commonwealth Games, without having to put in front of the field can. In the 2011 Indian Ocean Island Games he finished third in the men's singles.In 2012, he took part in the Badminton Asia Championships. In May 2012, Ajfan received a wild card to attend the Olympic Games in London where he was eliminated in the first round. He was the flag bearer for Maldives during the opening ceremony of the 2012 Summer Olympics.

Personal life
Mohamed Ajfan Rasheed run a Ajfan International Badminton Academy (AIBA).

References

External links
 
 
 
 
 
 
 

1990 births
Living people
People from Malé
Maldivian male badminton players
Badminton players at the 2012 Summer Olympics
Olympic badminton players of the Maldives
Badminton players at the 2010 Asian Games
Badminton players at the 2014 Asian Games
Badminton players at the 2018 Asian Games
Asian Games competitors for the Maldives
Commonwealth Games competitors for the Maldives
Badminton players at the 2010 Commonwealth Games
Badminton players at the 2014 Commonwealth Games
Badminton players at the 2022 Commonwealth Games